Clanculus korkosi is a species of sea snail, a marine gastropod mollusk in the family Trochidae, the top snails.

Description
The height of the shell attains 14 mm.

Distribution
This marine species occurs in the Red Sea.

References

External links
 

korkosi
Gastropods described in 2000